Celebrity MasterChef Australia is an Australian competitive cooking game show. It is spin-off of MasterChef Australia, itself an adaptation of the British show MasterChef, and features celebrity contestants.

The first series began production in early September 2009, and premiered on Network Ten on 30 September 2009. Judges Matt Preston, George Calombaris and Gary Mehigan returned from MasterChef Australia for the first series of the show, with Calombaris and Mehigan also taking over as hosts from Sarah Wilson. Former world-record holder and Olympic medallist swimmer Eamon Sullivan won the first series, taking home $50,000 for charity Swim Survive Stay Alive.

On 25 May 2021, it was announced that a second season of Celebrity MasterChef Australia had been commissioned, 12 years after the first edition had aired, it premiered on 10 October 2021 . Andy Allen, Melissa Leong and Jock Zonfrillo undertook the role of judges in the new season.

Format (2009 show)
In contrast to its parent show, the 2009 celebrity version was based around a heats and semi-finals format similar to MasterChef Goes Large, and was aired only once a week in an hourly format.

Celebrities were split into groups of three as they competed in a heat round featuring two challenges, with one celebrity making their way from each heat into the semi-finals. The heats consisted of an Invention Test, in which they prepared a dish of their own concoction, and a Pressure Test, in which they had to complete a dish from a professional chef. Due to the difficulty of these dishes, contestants were given a single "lifeline" in which the chef was able to aid them for 90 seconds.

The six remaining celebrities then faced further challenges in order to secure their place in the final.

Hosts and judges

Winners

Series synopsis

Series 1 (2009)

Celebrity MasterChef Australia, a spin-off featuring celebrities as contestants began production in early September 2009, and aired for ten weeks starting from 30 September 2009. The celebrity version, which features a heats and semi-finals format similar to MasterChef Goes Large, is based around weekly episodes.

The host of the first season of MasterChef Australia, Sarah Wilson, did not return to host the show. Ten states that she was dropped because "the appropriate role for Sarah was not achievable without dramatically changing the format", but Gary Mehigan, George Calombaris and Matt Preston returned as judges, Calombaris and Mehigan took Wilson's presenting role. It was won by Olympic swimmer Eamon Sullivan, who took home $50,000 for charity Swim Survive Stay Alive.

In February 2010, executive producer Mark Fennessy stated that he doubted the spin-off would return for a second series.

Series 2 (2021)

On 25 May 2021, it was announced that a second edition of Celebrity MasterChef Australia had been commissioned, 12 years after the first edition had aired. It aired in late 2021. Andy Allen, Melissa Leong and Jock Zonfrillo undertook the role of judges in the new season.

On 17 June 2021, Network Ten announced the 10 celebrity contestants competing on the second series of the show. Former AFL player Nick Riewoldt won the series, winning $100,000 for charity Maddie Riewoldt’s Vision.

Reception

Ratings

References

External links

2009 Australian television series debuts
2009 Australian television series endings
MasterChef Australia
2009 Australian television seasons
English-language television shows
Television shows set in Sydney
Australian television spin-offs
Masterchef
Australian television series based on British television series